Eugomontia is a genus of green algae in the order Ulotrichales.

References

External links

Ulvophyceae genera
Ulotrichales